Miltiadis "Miltos" Stefanidis (born 17 December 1995) is a Greek footballer midfielder. He has also played football in the youth ranks of Panserraikos.

Career

Club career
Stefanidis started his football with Panserraikos. He subsequently moved to Iraklis, in 2012, where he started playing for the club's youth team. On 19 August 2014 he signed a professional contract with Iraklis. Stefanidis made his full professional debut for Iraklis in a Greek Cup match against Ethnikos Gazoros. He was released by Iraklis on 10 July 2015.

References

1995 births
Living people
Iraklis Thessaloniki F.C. players
Panserraikos F.C. players
Greek footballers
Association football midfielders